Sharon Tooze, FMedSci is an American cell biologist who has made significant contributions to the Autophagy field. She is a senior scientist at the Francis Crick Institute and was awarded European Molecular Biology Organization (EMBO) membership in 2010.

Education and academic career 
Tooze studied for a BA in physics at the College of Holy Cross and a MSc in Cellular and Molecular Biology at Yale University.  Following this she went to the European Molecular Biology Laboratory (EMBL) and was awarded a PhD in Cell Biology. After a post doctoral fellowship she was promoted to staff scientist at EMBL in 1990. In 1994, Tooze moved to London to set up a lab studying the biogenesis of secretory granules at the Imperial Cancer Research Fund, later the Cancer Research UK London Research Institute (and now part of the Francis Crick Institute).

Research interests 
At EMBL Sharon Tooze studied transport of a viral glycoprotein from a SARS virus and showed that O-linked glycosylation starts in the ER-Golgi intermediate compartment. Later she became interested in organelle biogenesis and in how immature secretory granules form from the trans-Golgi network in neuroendocrine cells.

In 2006, Tooze developed interest in autophagy and the biogenesis of autophagosomes. Since then her lab has identified several mammalian Atg proteins and continues to contribute to understanding of autophagy at the molecular cell biology level.

Professional associations and awards 

 Sharon Tooze is a member of the British Society for Cell Biology.
In 2010 Tooze was awarded EMBO membership.
 In 2017, she was awarded an advanced ERC grant.
 Tooze is an affiliate member of the Autophagy Inflammation and Metabolism Centre of Biomedical Research Excellence.
In 2018, she became an elected member of the Academy of Medical Sciences.

References 

Fellows of the Academy of Medical Sciences (United Kingdom)
Academics of the Francis Crick Institute
21st-century American biologists
College of the Holy Cross alumni
Yale University alumni
Year of birth missing (living people)
Living people